The Jishui River is a river in Taiwan. It flows through Tainan City for 65 km.

See also
List of rivers in Taiwan

References

Rivers of Taiwan
Landforms of Tainan